Georissus, also called minute mud-loving beetles, is the only genus in the beetle family Georissidae (or Georyssidae). They are tiny insects living in wet soil, often near water. They are found on every continent except Antarctica.

Characteristics
Georissidae are small beetles (length 1–2 mm). They have a broadly oval body whose outline is more or less interrupted between the pronotum and the elytra.  The head and pronotum are granulate, the prosternum is rudimentary, without intercoxal processes. The anterior coxae and trochanters are fused. The basal ventrite is very large.

Ecology 
Species are generally found within mud and sand at the periphery of rivers and streams, but also occur in tropical rainforest leaf litter. Species of Georissus are predators on invertebrates, and under laboratory conditions sometimes engage in cannibalism.  Species within the genus are known for their habit of psammophory (actively covering their elytra with sand or mud) which helps protect them against predators.

Systematics and evolution
There are about 75 living species, including:
Georissus australis
Georissus babai 
Georissus bipartitus 
Georissus caelatus
Georissus californicus 
Georissus canalifer
Georissus capitatus 
Georissus coelosternus 
Georissus costatus 
Georissus crenulatus 
Georissus formosanus 
Georissus fusicornis 
Georissus granulosus 
Georissus instabilis 
Georissus japonicus
Georissus kingii 
Georissus kurosawai 
Georissus laesicollis 
Georissus minusculus
Georissus occidentalis
Georissus pusillus 
Georissus sakaii 
Georissus septemcostatus 
Georissus substriatus 
Georissus trifossulatus
The genus is divided into three subgenera (Georissus, Neogeorissus and Nipponogeorissus). Formerly it was included within the family Hydrophilidae. Recent molecular data indicate, that they belong to a clade comprising the small groups of Hydrophiloidea - Epimetopidae, Hydrochidae, Helophoridae and Georissidae.

References

Hydrophiloidea
Staphyliniformia genera
Taxa named by Pierre André Latreille